Galaroza is a town and municipality located in the Parque Natural de la Sierra de Aracena y Picos de Aroche, which is in the province of Huelva, Spain. According to the 2005 census, the city has a population of 1,642 inhabitants. In 2015 this figure decreased to 1,560.

References

External links
Galaroza - Sistema de Información Multiterritorial de Andalucía

Municipalities in the Province of Huelva